The following is a complete discography of the band Reel Big Fish.

Studio albums

Live albums

Compilations

EPs
Keep Your Receipt EP - July 1, 1997, Mojo Records/Jive Records
Sold Out EP - 2002, Mojo Records/Jive Records (#62 UK)
Duet All Night Long (split EP with Zolof the Rock & Roll Destroyer) - February 20, 2007, Reignition Records
Happy Skalidays - December 15, 2014, Rock Ridge Music

Demos
In The Good Old Days... (1992)
Return of the Mullet (REEL BIG FISH) (1994)
Buy This! (1994)

Video
 The Show Must Go Off! Reel Big Fish - Live at the House of Blues (2003)
 Reel Big Fish Live! In Concert! (2009)

7" vinyl records
Teen Beef (with Goldfinger on reverse side)(1996)
Vacationing in Palm Springs (with Cherry Poppin' Daddies on reverse side) (1997)
Where Have You Been? (UK Exclusive) (2002)
Monkey Man (UK Exclusive) (2005)

Singles

Soundtrack
 Misfits Of Ska - "Skatanic" (1995)
 Take Warning: The Songs of Operation Ivy - "Unity" (1997)
 The Duran Duran Tribute Album - "Hungry Like the Wolf" (1997)
 BASEketball Original Soundtrack - "Take On Me", "Beer" (1998)
 Where is My Mind? - A Tribute to the Pixies - "Gigantic" (1999)
 Metalliska - "Kiss Me Deadly" (2000)
 The Solution to Benefit Heal the Bay - "Kiss Me Deadly" (2000)
 Samba De Amigo - "Take On Me" (2000)
 The Wild Thornberrys Movie Soundtrack - "Monkey Man" (2002)
 Because We Care: A Benefit for the Children's Hospital of Orange County - "Doo-Doo" (2002)
 Dive into Disney - "Baroque Hoedown (Main Street Electrical Parade)" (2002)
 Mosh Pit on Disney (Japanese Only) - "It's Not Easy (Pete's Dragon)" (2004)
 Dead Bands Party: A Tribute to Oingo Boingo - "We Close Our Eyes" (2005)
 Go Cat Go! A Tribute to Stray Cats - "Stray Cat Strut" (2006)
 TOKYOPOP Presents: Anime Trax, Vol. 1 - "Rave-o-lution" (Rave Master theme) (2006)
 Ladybird Soundtrack - "Snoop Dog, Baby" (2017)
 Clerks III Soundtrack - "No Hope" (a Louser song featuring Reel Big Fish) (2022)

Multiple titled songs
Songs that have different titles on different releases, despite being essentially the same song.

 "Fuck Yourself" (Everything Sucks) / "All I Want Is More" (Turn the Radio Off)
 "Cool Ending" (Turn the Radio Off) / "I'm Cool" (Everything Sucks, Why Do They Rock So Hard?)
  "Thank You for Not Moshing" (Why Do They Rock So Hard?) / "In the Pit" (Our Live Album Is Better than Your Live Album)
 "Big Fuckin' Star" (Everything Sucks) / "Big Star"  (Why Do They Rock So Hard?)

Cover songs
Reel Big Fish are well known for their cover songs (so much so that their former label, Jive Records, chose to promote the album We're Not Happy 'Til You're Not Happy with stickers on the CD jewel case proclaiming that the album included "Talkin' 'bout a Revolution" and "Story of My Life"; both covers) and frequently end live shows with their cover of a-ha's 1985 hit "Take On Me". Reel Big Fish released their first studio album composed only of cover songs, entitled Fame, Fortune and Fornication, in January 2009.

Although the band are known to play a variety of other songs live regularly, this is a comprehensive, roughly chronological list of all known cover songs officially recorded by Reel Big Fish.

An instrumental version of the song also exists

bonus track only available on the vinyl album or via download

References

Category: The History Of Reel Big Fish

Discographies of American artists
Rock music group discographies